Andriy Dmytrovych Nediak (born 27 March 1963) is a Ukrainian football defender who played for Vorskla and Naftokhimik. Since 2005 he is the director for Ukrainian Second League club Kremin.

Club history
Andriy Nediak began his football career in CYSS Kolos in Poltava. He played for Vorskla in 1980 and 1985. Later Nediak played for Metalist during 1981–1984. Part of 1984 he spent in Mayak. In 1989, he was with Dynamo Bila Tserkva and in 1991 he played for Kremin. Later he played Naftokhimik from 1992 to 1994.

Career statistics

References

External links
  Profile - Official Kremin site
  Profile on the FFU website
  Players - Official Vorskla site
 Profile - KLISF site

1963 births
Living people
People from Kremenchuk
Soviet footballers
Ukrainian footballers
FC Vorskla Poltava players
FC Metalist Kharkiv players
FC Ros Bila Tserkva players
FC Kremin Kremenchuk players
FC Naftokhimik Kremenchuk players
Association football defenders
Sportspeople from Poltava Oblast